The Low Tone Club  is a Colombian comedy-drama television series for children and adolescents produced by TeleColombia for the Walt Disney Company. The series premiered on February 22, 2023 on Disney+.

Plot  
Amaranto Molina, an unconventional music teacher, begins teaching at a music school where only students who meet the ideal of commercial success are promoted. Each year, the school's principal, Eduardo Kramer, selects five students who are nicknamed the "High Tones" and become part of the school's prestigious teen band. Molina, on the other hand, is in charge of the so-called "Low Tones," a group of students whose talents do not meet the school's standards. The headstrong teacher and the "Low Tones" embark on a musical journey in which the teacher's unconventional methods help heal wounds and inspire each of them to express their unique talents. Along the way, the students learn more about Mr. Molina and encounter their teacher's mysterious past, which he always tries to hide.

Cast 
 Carlos Vives as Amaranto Molina
 Julián Arango as Eduardo Kramer
 Catalina Polo as Martina
 María Fernanda Marín as Lala
 Manuela Duque as Roxana
 Salomé Camargo as Cami
 Elena Vives as Amalia
 Brainer Gamboa as Romario
 Kevin Bury as Pa-Pi-Yón
 Gregorio Umaña as Raphaelo
 Pitizion as KJ
 Juan Manuel Lenis as Peter
 Juan Camilo González as Dardo
 Juanse Diez as Pablo
 Sharik Abusaid as Lina
 Melanie Dell'Olmo as Sara
 Juan Diego Panadero as Panchito
 Giseth Mariano as Minerva
 Deisy Mariano as Mariana
 Zoila Mariano as Mona
 Luis Fernando Salas as Ocampo

Episodes

References

External links 
 

Comedy-drama television series
Television shows filmed in Colombia
2023 Colombian television series debuts
Spanish-language television shows
Disney+ original programming